Brníčko is a municipality and village in Šumperk District in the Olomouc Region of the Czech Republic. It has about 600 inhabitants.

Administrative parts
The village of Strupšín is an administrative part of Brníčko.

History
The first written mention of Brníčko is from 1350. The local castle was the seat of the Tunkl aristocratic family. From the late 14th century until the Thirty Years' War, Brníčko was a small town and the centre of a small estate. After the war, it was acquired by the House of Liechtenstein and lost its significance.

References

Villages in Šumperk District